Trichadenotecnum alexanderae is a species of common barklouse in the family Psocidae. It is found in North America.

References

Psocidae
Insects described in 1948